The Art Newspaper is a monthly print publication, with daily updates online, founded in 1990 and based in London and New York City. It covers news of the visual arts as they are affected by international politics and economics, developments in law, tax, the art market, the environment and official cultural policy.

Details
The Art Newspaper is published by The Art Newspaper SA and is based on an original concept by the Turin publisher, Umberto Allemandi, who founded the first monthly newspaper, in 1983. It covers news of the visual arts as they are affected by international politics and economics, developments in law, tax, the art market, the environment and official cultural policy. The publication is fed by a network of sister editions, with around fifty correspondents in over thirty countries. In addition to London and New York City, the network has editorial offices in Turin, Paris, Moscow, Beijing and Tel Aviv.

The Art Newspaper produces daily papers during the major art fairs, such as Art Basel and Frieze, and weekly podcasts on topical subjects. It is a campaigning newspaper, which has reported regularly on the trade in illicitly excavated antiquities, on damage to the heritage in warfare, and the maladministration and corruption that prevents Venice being protected from sea level rise, excessive tourism and the cruise ships.

Anna Somers Cocks OBE founded The Art Newspaper for Umberto Allemandi's publishing house in 1990. It was edited by Laura Suffield 1992–94, then by Somers Cocks again until 2002. She was succeeded by Cristina Ruiz 2002–2004, Jane Morris 2004–2016, then Javier Pes 2016–17. Alison Cole is the current editor. Inna Bazhenova, a mathematician, engineer, collector, and the publisher of the Russian edition of the paper, bought The Art Newspaper with the French, Russian and Chinese editions in 2014.

Reviewers and commentators for the paper include: former Tate director Nicholas Serota, Performa founder-director RoseLee Goldberg; former Pompidou Centre director Jean-Hubert Martin; archaeologist Colin Renfrew; Venice Biennale curator Robert Storr, writer Anthony Haden-Guest and artist Grayson Perry. The publication won the National Art Collections Fund prize in 1992.

The Art Newspaper network
(in chronological order of year of establishment)
  (Torino, Italy, founded in 1983)
The Art Newspaper (London, founded in 1990, based in London and New York City)
The Art Newspaper Russia (Moscow, founded in 2012)
The Art Newspaper China (Beijing, founded in 2013
The Art Newspaper France (Paris, founded in 2018). Currently operating as an online daily edition called The Art Newspaper Daily. Formerly Le Journal des Arts (Paris, founded in 1994)
 The Art Newspaper Israel (Tel Aviv, founded in 2019)
 Ta Nea tis Technis (Greece)

References

External links

1983 establishments in England
Visual arts magazines published in the United Kingdom
Monthly magazines published in the United Kingdom
Contemporary art magazines
Magazines published in London
Magazines established in 1983
Works about visual art